is a former Japanese Nippon Professional Baseball player.

External links

1976 births
Living people
Baseball people from Saga Prefecture
Aoyama Gakuin University alumni
Japanese baseball players
Kintetsu Buffaloes players
Osaka Kintetsu Buffaloes players
Tohoku Rakuten Golden Eagles players
Japanese baseball coaches
Nippon Professional Baseball coaches
People from Imari, Saga
Wei Chuan Dragons coaches
Japanese expatriate baseball people in Taiwan